The Who are an English rock band, whose most commercially successful line-up was Roger Daltrey, Pete Townshend, John Entwistle and Keith Moon. Originally known as the Detours, the group performed with varying personnel in and around the London area until 1964, when Moon joined. They continued to perform exclusively in Europe until their first American tour in 1967.

The group's fourth album, the rock opera Tommy (1969) was a critical and commercial success. The Who played the rock opera live from 1969 to 1970, which elevated the band's critical standing. Their fifth album, Who's Next followed a series of free concerts at the Young Vic, London. They continued to tour to large audiences before taking a hiatus from live performances at the end of 1976.

In 1978, Moon died of a drug overdose, and the band, backed with drummer Kenney Jones and keyboardist John "Rabbit" Bundrick, toured 1979 and 1980 supporting their album Who Are You. After a successful tour in 1982, the band broke up. Following two reunion gigs in 1985 (for Live Aid) and 1988, the band toured in 1989 with an expanded line-up. The band officially reunited in 1996, starting with a two-year retrospective tour of Quadrophenia. After the death of Entwistle in 2002, Townshend and Daltrey continued as the Who, releasing two new albums in 2006 and 2019 respectively and continued touring.

Early performances

By 1962, the founding members of the Who (Daltrey, Townshend and Entwistle) were playing in the Detours regularly around West London. The following February, they began a Monday night residency at the White Hart Hotel in Acton and also started playing regularly at the Oldfield Hotel in Greenford. By the end of 1963, they had started to support major groups, including an opening slot for The Rolling Stones at St Mary's Hall, Putney on 22 December.

On 2 May 1964, Moon played his first gig with the band in a pub on the North Circular Road. That June, the group started a residency at the Railway Hotel, Harrow, which is where managers Kit Lambert and Chris Stamp first met them. Some footage of an early appearance at the Railway was later used for the film The Kids Are Alright.

Marquee and national tours

On 24 November 1964, the Who began a Tuesday night residency at the Marquee, which established their national reputation. Over the course of the following sixteen weeks, they broke attendance records in the club, and were booked for a further seven. Following chart success of "I Can't Explain", the Who began to tour nationwide. On 6 August 1965, the group played a major gig at the fifth National Jazz and Blues Festival in Richmond. They played their first concerts outside the UK in September 1965, touring the Netherlands and Scandinavia. Immediately afterwards, Daltrey was fired from the group, but re-hired three days later as too many gigs were booked ahead.

They continued to gig continually around the UK through 1966, and underwent a second Scandinavian tour that October. The group's debts, caused by regular destruction of their musical gear, meant that they needed to spend most of the time touring. In January 1967, the group played the Saville Theatre for the first time, on the same bill as Jimi Hendrix. They played their first tour of Italy the following month.

First American tours
On 25 March 1967, the Who played their first concerts in the US as part of the Fifth Dimension package tour at the RKO 58th Street Theater, New York. The group played five shows a day for nine days, running to a tight schedule with only two songs in their set. They toured Germany in April, followed by a short Scandinavian tour.

In June, the Who flew out to the US to begin their first proper tour there. They played their first concert at the Fillmore Auditorium, San Francisco on 16 June. Two days later, they played their first major performance in the country at the Monterey Pop Festival. The Who argued backstage with Hendrix about the running order, before agreeing to go on first following a coin toss. Their performance, which included Townshend destroying a Fender Stratocaster and Moon kicking over his drum kit, was filmed by D.A. Pennebaker. The following month, the group began a coast-to-coast US tour with Herman's Hermits, which included a notorious after-party show in Flint, Michigan on 23 August (Moon's 21st birthday).

In October, the Who began a tour of British theatres. However, the opening shows descended into violence after the group overran their stage time, causing the curtain to come down on them. A two-week tour of the US began in November, which including a performance at Union Catholic High School in New Jersey on 29 November. The group spent the rest of 1967 playing sporadic gigs in the UK.

The Who toured Australia and New Zealand in January 1968, along with the Small Faces. However, the shows were a disaster, with both groups getting mocked by the local press and the bands trashing their hotel rooms. After an incident that took place on a flight to Sydney, the band were briefly arrested in Melbourne and then forced to leave the country; Prime Minister John Gorton sent a telegram to The Who telling them never to return to Australia. The Who would not return to Australia again until 2004. The group spent much of the rest of the year on the road, including two lengthy US tours. A final package tour with the Small Faces, Joe Cocker and the Crazy World of Arthur Brown took place in November, and on 10 December, the group made a guest appearance on the television special, The Rolling Stones Rock and Roll Circus, which was subsequently shelved by the Stones.

Tommy Tour

The Who spent the start of 1969 sporadically gigging the UK in between recording the rock opera Tommy. They began rehearsing a live performance of the rock opera at Hanwell Community Centre on 1 April, where they worked out a running order that could be played live by the group. Daltrey's voice had improved, and the quality of their live shows improved.

The first live performance of Tommy was a press reception at Ronnie Scott's on 1 May 1969. The following day, the group flew out to New York for a US tour, starting at the Grande Ballroom, Detroit. On 17 August, the Who appeared at the Woodstock festival, having been delayed from the previous evening after the show ran late. At the conclusion of "Pinball Wizard", Abbie Hoffman took to the stage to protest about the imprisonment of John Sinclair before being kicked offstage by Townshend, while during "See Me, Feel Me", the sun rose, almost as if on cue. Two weeks later, the group played the second Isle of Wight Festival, using one of the largest live PAs available. In October 1969, the Who played six shows at the Fillmore East, where Leonard Bernstein praised them for their new music. The group's show on 14 December at the London Coliseum was filmed for a possible future Tommy feature. The group made a second trip to the Isle of Wight, appearing at the 1970 festival on 29 August, before an audience of 600,000. The last live performance for 1970 was at The Roundhouse, London on 20 December. Townshend said "This is the very last time we'll play Tommy on stage", to which Moon promptly cried, "Thank Christ for that!"

Who's Next Tour
The Who held a press conference on 13 January 1971, explaining that they would be giving a series of concerts at the Young Vic theatre, where they would develop the fictional elements of the proposed film along with the audience. After Keith Moon had completed his work on the film 200 Motels, the group performed their first Young Vic concert on 15 February. The show included a new quadrophonic public address system which cost £30,000; the audience was mainly invited from various organisations such as youth clubs, with only a few tickets on sale to the general public. The group gave a further series of concerts at the Young Vic on 25 and 26 April, which were recorded on the Rolling Stones Mobile Studio by Andy Johns, but Townshend grew disillusioned with Lifehouse and further shows were cancelled.

The Who starting touring the US in July 1971, just before Who's Next was released. The set list was revamped, and while it included a smaller selection of numbers from Tommy, several new numbers from the new album such as "My Wife", "Baba O'Riley" and "Won't Get Fooled Again" became live favourites. The latter two songs involved the band playing to a backing track containing the synthesizer parts. The tour moved to the UK in September, including a show at The Oval, Kennington in front of 35,000 fans, and the opening gig at the Rainbow Theatre in Finsbury Park, before going back to the US, ending in Seattle on 15 December. The group then took eight months off touring, the longest break of their career at that point.

The Who resumed touring on 11 August 1972 in Frankfurt, Germany as part of a European tour, which was the first time they had played together for several months. The only gig for the first half of 1973 was on 10 March at The Hague.

Quadrophenia Tour
The Who wanted to play Quadrophenia live, but would not be able to play all the instruments on the album on stage. Townshend wanted Chris Stainton to accompany them as a touring keyboardist, but Daltrey objected. They decided to play along to backing tapes as they had already done for "Baba O'Riley" and "Won't Get Fooled Again". The group only allowed two days rehearsals, one of which was abandoned after Daltrey punched Townshend following an argument.

The tour started on 28 October 1973. The original plan had been to play most of the album, but after the first gig at Stoke-on-Trent, the band dropped "The Dirty Jobs", "Is It In My Head" and "I've Had Enough" from the set. Both Daltrey and Townshend felt they had to describe the plot in detail to the audience, which took up valuable time on stage. A few shows later in Newcastle upon Tyne, the backing tapes to "5:15" came in late. Townshend stopped the show, grabbed sound engineer Bob Pridden, who was controlling the mixing desk, and dragged him onstage, shouting obscenities at him. Townshend subsequently picked up some of the tapes and threw them over the stage, kicked his amplifier over, and walked off. The band returned 20 minutes later, playing older material. Townshend and Moon appeared on local television the following day and attempted to brush things off. The Who played two other shows in Newcastle without incident.

The US tour started on 20 November at the Cow Palace in San Francisco. The group were nervous about playing Quadrophenia after the British tour, especially Moon. Before the show, he was offered some tranquillisers from a fan. Just after the show started, the fan collapsed and was hospitalised. Moon's playing, meanwhile, became incredibly erratic, particularly during Quadrophenia where he did not seem to be able to keep time with the backing tapes. Towards the end of the show, during "Won't Get Fooled Again", he passed out over his drumkit. After a 20-minute wait, Moon reappeared onstage, but after a few bars of "Magic Bus", collapsed again, and was immediately taken to hospital. Scot Halpin, an audience member, convinced promoter Bill Graham to let him play drums, and the group closed the show with him. Moon had a day to recover, and by the next show at The Forum, was playing at his usual strength.

The group began to get used to the backing tapes, and the remainder of gigs for the US tour were successful. The tour continued in February 1974, with a short series of gigs in France. The final show at the Palais des Sports de Gerland in Lyon on the 24th was the last time Quadrophenia was played as a stage piece with Moon, who died in 1978. Townshend later said that Daltrey "ended up hating Quadrophenia – probably because it had bitten back".

The Who played a sporadic selection of shows for the rest of 1974. On 18 May, they headlined the "Summer of 74" festival at The Valley in front of an estimated 80,000 people. On 10-11 and 13–14 June, the group played at Madison Square Garden, their first show in New York in almost three years.

The Who by Numbers Tour

The Who began their "Greatest Rock and Roll Band In The World" tour on 3 October 1975, the same day that The Who By Numbers was released. They toured the UK and Europe before flying to the US in November, and ended the year with three of shows at the Hammersmith Odeon from 21 to 23 December.

Owing to group debts, the Who spent much of 1976 touring. This included lengthy coast-to-coast trips across the US, playing in large arenas and stadiums, and was the most extensive tour they had undertaken in five years. On 31 May, they headlined the "Who Put The Boot In" festival at The Valley in front of 60,000 fans. The concert earned them a world record for the loudest band, with concert volume registering 120 decibels. This was followed by similar shows at Celtic Park, Glasgow and Swansea City Football Ground. The final date of the tour was in Toronto, Canada on 21 October, which was Moon's last public performance.

The Kids Are Alright concerts
After the 1976 concerts, the Who were inactive during the first half of 1977, during which time punk rock became popular, with several punk bands citing the group as an influence. When they reconvened in September to work on The Kids Are Alright, Townshend announced there would be no touring. The only concert played that year was a closed show at the Gaumont State Cinema, Kilburn on 15 December. It was intended to be used for The Kids Are Alright but almost none of the footage appeared in the final cut.

Unhappy with the Gaumont performance, the Who played another show at Shepperton Studios on 25 May 1978 in front of a hand-picked audience of 500. The performances of "Baba O'Riley" and "Won't Get Fooled Again" were used in the finished film. It was the last concert Moon played with the group; he died on 7 September.

With Kenney Jones
Following Moon's death, the Who recruited drummer Kenney Jones and played their first concert together at the Rainbow Theatre on 2 May 1979. They played a number of other shows in the UK and Europe over summer, before beginning a tour of the US in September. On 3 December, at the group's performance at the Riverfront Coliseum, Cincinnati, Ohio, eleven fans died after being crushed in a stampede to get into the stadium. The group continued to tour the US into 1980.

At the start of 1981, the Who played their longest British tour in ten years. In late 1982, they toured the US as the First Farewell Tour, playing their final show in Toronto.

Concert tours and performances

Footnotes

References

External links 
 The Who Online Concert Guide

 
Lists of concert tours